The 2020 Austin Bold FC season is the second season for Austin Bold FC in the USL Championship (USL-C), the second-tier professional soccer league in the United States and Canada. This article covers the period from November 18, 2019, the day after the 2019 USL-C Playoff Final, to the conclusion of the 2020 USL-C Playoff Final, scheduled for November 12–16, 2020.

Club

Competitions

Exhibitions

USL Championship

Standings — Group D

Match results
On January 9, 2020, the USL announced the 2020 season schedule.

U.S. Open Cup 

As a USL Championship club, Austin will enter the competition in the Second Round, to be played April 7–9.

References

Austin Bold FC
Austin Bold

Austin